Patrick Anthony Lawlor  (12 February 1893 – 19 January 1979) was a New Zealand journalist, editor, bibliophile, writer and Catholic layman. He was born and died in Wellington, New Zealand.

In 1958 he urged the restoration of Katherine Mansfield's birthplace; by then divided into two rundown flats, but now preserved as the Katherine Mansfield House and Garden.

In the 1976 New Year Honours, Lawlor was appointed an Officer of the Order of the British Empire, for services to literature and the community.

References

External links
 Finding aid to Patrick Anthony Lawlor letters at Columbia University. Rare Book & Manuscript Library.
 

1893 births
1979 deaths
Roman Catholic writers
New Zealand Roman Catholics
People from Wellington City
20th-century Roman Catholics
New Zealand Officers of the Order of the British Empire
20th-century New Zealand journalists
20th-century New Zealand writers